Red Lion is the name of some places in the U.S. state of New Jersey:

Red Lion, Burlington County, New Jersey
Red Lion, Middlesex County, New Jersey

See also

Red Lion (disambiguation)